The 2003 World Women's Curling Championship (branded as 2003 Ford World Women's Curling Championship for sponsorship reasons) was held at the Winnipeg Arena in Winnipeg, Manitoba, Canada from April 5–13, 2003.

Teams

Round-robin standings

Round-robin results

Draw 1
April 5, 2003 08:00

Draw 2
April 5, 2003 18:00

Draw 3
April 6, 2003 13:00

Draw 4
April 7, 2003 08:00

Draw 5
April 7, 2003 18:00

Draw 6
April 8, 2003 13:00

Draw 7
April 9, 2003 08:00

Draw 8
April 9, 2003 18:00

Draw 9
April 10, 2003 13:00

Playoffs

Brackets

Semifinals
April 11, 2003 18:00

Bronze medal game
April 12, 2003 08:00

Final
April 12, 2003 12:30

Player percentages

References
 

Curling Championship
2003
Curling Championship
Curling competitions in Winnipeg
2003 in Canadian women's sports
April 2003 sports events in Canada
International sports competitions hosted by Canada
2000s in Winnipeg